Alekhis Fotiadis (born 25 July 1967) is a Cypriot alpine skier. He competed at the 1984, 1988 and the 1992 Winter Olympics. At the first Games in Sarajevo, he placed 69th in the giant slalom and did not finish the slalom. Four years later in Calgary, he placed 58th in the giant slalom. He also competed in the supergiant and slalom, but failed to finish both events. At the last Olympics, he placed 81st in the super giant, 61st in the giant slalom and 44th in the slalom. He was a member of the Cyprus Ski Club.

References

External links
 

1967 births
Living people
Cypriot male alpine skiers
Olympic alpine skiers of Cyprus
Alpine skiers at the 1984 Winter Olympics
Alpine skiers at the 1988 Winter Olympics
Alpine skiers at the 1992 Winter Olympics
Sportspeople from Nicosia